Morgan Jones (born 23 May 1999) is a Welsh rugby union player, currently playing for United Rugby Championship side Scarlets. His preferred position is lock.

Professional career
Born in Nuneaton, Jones was part of the Leicester Tigers academy until he was 18. After departing the club, Jones came into contact with the Welsh Exiles programme, qualifying for Wales through a Llanelli-born grandfather. Jones moved from the midlands to Llanelli, joining the Scarlets academy. While part of the academy, Jones attained in a degree on criminology and criminal justice at Swansea University. 

Jones played for Wales U18, and made his Wales U20 debut during the 2018 Six Nations Under 20s Championship. An ankle injury ruled Jones out of the 2019 Six Nations Under 20s Championship, but he returned to the team for the 2019 World Rugby Under 20 Championship.

Jones signed his first professional contract for Scarlets in August 2020. He made his Scarlets debut in Round 3 of the 2020–21 Pro14 against Benetton. During the match, Jones received a red card, but upon review after the match, the card was rescinded. Jones extended his contract in April 2021.

References

External links
itsrugby.co.uk Profile
Scarlets profile

1999 births
Living people
Rugby union locks
Rugby union players from Warwickshire
Scarlets players
Welsh rugby union players